Elder's Mill Covered Bridge and Elder Mill is a covered bridge near Watkinsville, Georgia, and was listed on the National Register of Historic Places in 1994.

It is located on Elder Mill Rd., 4/5 mi. south of its junction with GA 15. The listing includes the covered bridge built in 1897 and a c.1900 three-story wood-frame mill building. The bridge was built in 1897 by Nathaniel Richardson to bring the Watkinsville-Athens Road across Call Creek in Clarke County, and was moved in 1924 to its current location spanning Rose Creek in Oconee County.

See also
List of covered bridges in Georgia

References

Covered bridges in Georgia (U.S. state)
National Register of Historic Places in Oconee County, Georgia
Infrastructure completed in 1897